The Agricultural Act of 1954 (P.L. 83-690) is a United States federal law that, among other provisions, authorized a Commodity Credit Corporation reserve for foreign and domestic relief.

The Act established a flexible price support for basic commodities (excluding tobacco) at 82.5-90% of parity and authorized a Commodity Credit Corporation (CCC) reserve for foreign and domestic relief.  Title VII was designated the National Wool Act of 1954 and provided for a new price support program for wool and mohair to encourage increased domestic production.  Price support for wool and mohair continued through marketing year 1995, at which time it was phased down and terminated under the explicit mandate of P.L. 103-130 (November 1, 1993).  Mandatory support for wool and mohair was restored by the 2002 farm bill (P.L. 101-171, Sec. 1201-1205). 

This Act is separate from, and should not be confused with, the Agricultural Trade Development and Assistance Act of 1954.

References

External links
Information about U.S. agricultural laws, from cornell.edu

1954 in law
1954 in the United States
United States federal agriculture legislation
83rd United States Congress